Mozhan Marnò (born May 3, 1980) is an Iranian-American film and television actress. She is known for her roles in The Blacklist and House of Cards.

Early life and education 
Marnò was born in Los Angeles. Her parents are from Iran and met in California. She was educated at Phillips Academy, Andover, Massachusetts. She received her BA in French and German comparative literature from Barnard College of Columbia University and her MFA in Acting from the Yale School of Drama.

Personal life
She currently resides in Brooklyn, New York. In addition to English she speaks French, German, Persian, and some Italian.

Career 
Marnò played the title role in the 2008 film The Stoning of Soraya M., about a woman whose husband falsely accuses her of adultery, resulting in her death by stoning. In addition she has had roles in a number of television series including The Paul Reiser Show, The Glades, Hung, The Mentalist, Bones, The Unit, Medium, K-ville, and Standoff. Marnò also appeared in the Untitled John Wells Medical Drama Pilot, which was not aired. She also stars in Ana Lily Amirpour's directorial debut, A Girl Walks Home Alone at Night, produced by Elijah Wood, under his company, The Woodshed. In 2011, Marnò voiced Mirabelle Ervine, a Breton mage and Master Wizard of the College of Winterhold, in the critically acclaimed video game The Elder Scrolls V: Skyrim. She played reporter Ayla Sayyad on seasons 2 and 3 of the acclaimed Netflix series House of Cards, for which she was nominated for a SAG award. She played Mossad agent and assassin Samar Navabi in seasons 2-6 of The Blacklist.

Marnò also directs and writes screenplays. Her first feature-length screenplay, When the Lights Went Out, was a quarter finalist for the Nicholl Fellowship. She adapted When the Lights Went Out as a play and it was mounted at New York Stage and Film in July 2013 starring Laura Innes, and directed by Kate Whoriskey (Ruined). Marnò's short film, Incoming, which she wrote and directed, was accepted to the Noor Iranian Film Festival, LA SHORTS FEST, the Asians on Film Festival, and the DC Asian Pacific American Film Festival.

Filmography

Film

Television

Audio recordings

Video games

Awards and nominations

References

External links 
 

1980 births
Living people
Yale School of Drama alumni
American film actresses
American people of Iranian descent
21st-century American actresses
American television actresses
Actresses from Los Angeles
Barnard College alumni
American women screenwriters
Film directors from Los Angeles
Phillips Academy alumni